William Hopper (1915–1970) was an American actor.

William or Bill Hopper may also refer to:

People 
 William Hopper (industrialist) (1816-1885), Scottish industrialist and sports proponent in Imperial Russia
 Bill Hopper (baseball) (1891–1965), American baseball player
 Bill Hopper (footballer) (born 1938), English footballer
 Bill Hopper (rugby league) (1922–2008), Welsh rugby league footballer
 William Hopper (politician) (born 1929), British banker and politician
 William DeWolf Hopper (1858–1935), American actor
 William Hopper (1966–2017), Canadian author of The Heathen's Guide to World Religions and other works

Other uses 
 Bill hopper (furniture), a receptacle used in the United States House of Representatives

See also
Wilbert Hopper (1933–2006), Canadian civil servant and businessman